Dave Scott Feitl (born June 8, 1962) is a retired American professional basketball player who was selected by the Houston Rockets in the 2nd round (43rd overall) of the 1986 NBA draft. A 6'11" center from the University of Texas at El Paso, Feitl played in 5 NBA seasons for 4 teams. He played for the Rockets, Golden State Warriors, Washington Bullets and New Jersey Nets.

In his NBA career, Feitl played in 275 games and scored a total of 1,192 points. His best year as a professional came during the 1987–88 season as a member of the Warriors, appearing in 70 games and averaging 6.5 ppg.

External links
NBA statistics @ basketball-reference.com

1962 births
Living people
American expatriate basketball people in Italy
American men's basketball players
Basketball players from Pennsylvania
Centers (basketball)
Chicago Rockers players
Fortitudo Pallacanestro Bologna players
Golden State Warriors players
Houston Rockets draft picks
Houston Rockets players
New Jersey Nets players
People from Butler, Pennsylvania
UTEP Miners men's basketball players
Washington Bullets players